Alan IV de Rohan, called the Young (c. 1166 – 1205), was the eldest son of Alan III, Viscount of Rohan and Constance of Penthièvre. He was 4th Viscount of Rohan and Lord of Corlay. He took part to the Third Crusade.

Life
He married Mabilla of Fougères, a daughter of Raoul II, Baron of Fougères, Grand Seneschal of Brittany, Crusader, and Joan of Dol. She died before 1198.

They had six children:

 Geoffrey, 5th Viscount of Rohan, died without issue
 Alix of Rohan
 Catherine of Rohan
 Conan of Rohan (1190 - 1220)
 Oliver I, 6th Viscount of Rohan, died without issue
 Alan V, 7th Viscount of Rohan

Coat of arms

See also
 House of Rohan
 Viscounty of Rohan

References

12th-century Breton people
House of Rohan
Viscounts of Rohan
Chivalry
1160s births
1205 deaths